Adolf Franz Karl Viktor Maria Loos (10 December 1870 – 23 August 1933) was an Austrian and Czechoslovak architect, influential European theorist, and a polemicist of modern architecture. He was inspired by modernism and a widely-known critic of the Art Nouveau movement. His controversial views and literary contributions sparked the establishment of the Vienna Secession movement and postmodernism.

Loos was born in Brno to a family of sculptors and stonemasons. His almost deaf father, a stonemason, died when he was 9 and played a role in Loos' interest in arts and crafts. Loos later presented with his father's hearing impairment and other health-related issues. His lack of hearing contributed to his solitary personality. Loos had three tumultuous marriages that all ended in divorce and was convicted as a pedophile in 1928.

With changing interests, Loos attended multiple colleges also due to his poor academics and his different desires, which proved to be useful by providing him a diverse skillset for architecture. After leaving his last university, Loos visited America and became strongly impacted by the Chicago School of Architecture, being inspired by the architect Louis Sullivan and his form follows function philosophy.

Loos then went on to write many literary pieces including the satirical piece The Story of a Poor Rich Man and his most popular manifesto, Ornament and Crime, which advocated for smooth and clear surfaces in contrast to the lavish decorations of the fin de siècle, as well as the more modern aesthetic principles of the Vienna Secession, exemplified in his design of Looshaus, Vienna.

Loos became a pioneer of modern architecture and contributed a body of theory and criticism of Modernism in architecture and design and developed the "Raumplan" (literally spatial plan) method of arranging interior spaces, exemplified in Villa Müller in Prague. He died aged 62 on 23 August 1933 in Kalksburg near Vienna.

Early life

Youth 
Loos was born into a family of artisans on 10 December 1870 in Brno, in the Margraviate of Moravia region of the Austro-Hungarian Empire, today the eastern part of the Czech Republic. His father Adolf Loos was a German stonemason who died when Loos was nine years old. His mother, Marie Loos, was a sculptor who later continued to carry on the stonemason business after her husband's death. Young Adolf Loos had inherited his father's hearing impairment and was significantly handicapped by it throughout his life, contributing to his solitary character.

Education 
Loos attended several Gymnasium schools and sought a variety of programs. In 1884, Loos began his studies at the Stiftsgymnasium Melk for only a few months after failing an exam. He then studied mechanics at the Royal and Imperial State Technical College in Liberec, but dropped to pursue building technology. He then returned to mechanics again at State Crafts School in Brünn in 1889, and changed to architecture by studying at Dresden University of Technology from 1890 - 1893. Loos ultimately did not receive any academic degree due to his sporadic education pursuits, poor academics, and his enrollment to the Austrian military in 1889. His enrollment however also sparked some of Loos' interests, joining a dueling club in college.

Loos' diverse educational background provided him with a vast skillset which proved to be useful. For example, he could comprehend masonry and craftsman work and its impact on architecture. He additionally was acknowledged by many scholars and was treated highly in the architectural field due to his experience.

Career

United States 
Post college, Loos traveled to the United States and stayed there from 1893 to 1896 in desire to live auspiciously and to learn about outside architecture. He started in New York and financially supported himself by working as a mason, a floor-layer, and a dish-washer. These jobs allowed Loos to move to the Philadelphia countryside with his uncle Benjamin, where he worked as a watchmaker.  Living on the countryside made Loos admire America's rural culture, but he later traveled to New York and Chicago to explore American architecture.

On his first visit to Chicago, Loos was immediately inspired by the new American skyscrapers and the World's Columbian Exposition in 1893. Specifically, he was inspired by the architect Louis Sullivan and the Chicago School of Architecture, being in content with Sullivan's concept of form follows function in the literary piece Ornament in Architecture.

Although Loos left America in 1896, he later became involved with Chicago in 1922. Inspired by Sullivan, Loos submitted a column building design for the Chicago Tribune Tower Competition, where his design proposal followed a Doric column as the building's top, known as the Column Tower proposal. While he did not win, his architecture inspired post modernism ideas.

Vienna 
Loos returned to Vienna in 1896 and made it his permanent residence. He was a prominent figure in the city and a friend of Ludwig Wittgenstein, Arnold Schönberg, Peter Altenberg and Karl Kraus.

Inspired by his years in the New World he devoted himself to architecture. After briefly associating himself with the Vienna Secession in 1896, he rejected the style and advocated a new, plain, unadorned architecture. A utilitarian approach to use the entire floor plan completed his concept. Loos's early commissions consisted of interior designs for shops and cafés in Vienna.

Architectural theory

Loos authored several polemical works. In Spoken into the Void, published in 1900, he attacked the Vienna Secession, at a time when the movement was at its peak.

In his essays, Loos used provocative catchphrases and is noted for the essay/manifesto entitled Ornament and Crime, given in a lecture in 1910 and first published in 1913. He explored the idea that the progress of culture is associated with the elimination of ornament from everyday objects, asserting, "the evolution of culture is synonymous with the removal of ornamentation from objects of everyday use." It was therefore a crime to force craftsmen or builders to waste their time on ornamentation that served to hasten the time when an object would become obsolete (design theory). Loos's stripped-down buildings influenced the minimal massing of modern architecture, and stirred controversy. Although noted for the lack of ornamentation on their exteriors, the interiors of many of Loos's buildings are finished with rich and expensive materials, notably stone, marble and wood, displaying natural patterns and textures in flat planes, executed in first rate craftsmanship. The distinction is not between complicated and simple, but between "organic" decoration, such as that created by indigenous cultures (Loos mentions African textiles and Persian rugs), and superfluous decoration.

Loos was also interested in the decorative arts, collecting sterling silver and high quality leather goods, which he noted for their plain yet luxurious appeal. His glassware, produced by Lobmeyer, is still in production today. He also enjoyed fashion and men's clothing, designing the famed Kníže of Vienna, a haberdashery. His admiration for the fashion and culture of England and America can be seen in his short-lived publication Das Andere, which ran for just two issues in 1903 and included advertisements for 'English' clothing. In 1920, he had a brief collaboration with Frederick John Kiesler, an architect, theater and art-exhibition designer.

Loos House and other projects

From 1904 on, he was able to carry out big projects; the most notable was the so-called "Looshaus" (built from 1910 to 1912), originally for the Viennese tailor Goldman and Salatsch, for whom Loos had designed a store interior in 1898, and situated right across from the Habsburg city residence Hofburg Palace. The house, today located at the address Michaelerplatz 3, Vienna, and under monument preservation, was criticized by its contemporaries. The facade was dominated by rectilinear window patterns and a lack of stucco decoration and awnings, which earned it the nickname "House without Eyebrows"; Emperor Franz Joseph I of Austria was said to have despised the modern building so much that he avoided leaving the Hofburg Palace through a main gate in its vicinity. His work also includes the store of the men's fashion house Knize (built 1909–13), Am Graben 13, Café Museum (built 1899), Operngasse 7, Vienna, and the "American Bar" (built 1907–08), Kärntnerstrasse 10, Vienna.

Loos visited the island of Skyros in 1904 and was influenced by the cubic architecture of the Greek islands. When the Austro-Hungarian Empire collapsed after World War I Loos was awarded Czechoslovakian citizenship by President Masaryk. His main place of residence remained in Vienna. During the First Austrian Republic Loos became interested in public projects. He designed several housing projects for the City of Vienna, which was then nicknamed Red Vienna. From 1924 to 1928 Loos lived in Paris. He taught at the Sorbonne and was contracted to build a house for Tristan Tzara, which was completed 1925 on Avenue Junot 15, Paris. In 1928 he returned to Vienna.

Loos had an admiration for classical architecture, which is reflected in his writings and his entry to the 1922 Chicago Tribune competition. Loos's submission was a massive doric column.

Private life

Marriages
Loos was married three times. In July 1902, he married drama student . The marriage ended three years later in 1905. In 1919, he married 20-year-old Austrian-born Elsie Altmann, a dancer and operetta star and daughter of Adolf Altmann and Jeannette Gruenblatt. They divorced seven years later in 1926. In 1929 he married writer and photographer Claire Beck. She was the daughter of his clients Otto and Olga Beck, and 35 years his junior. They were divorced on 30 April 1932. Following their divorce, Claire Loos wrote Adolf Loos Privat, a literary work of snapshot-like vignettes about Loos's character, habits and sayings, published by the Johannes-Presse in Vienna in 1936. The book was intended to raise funds for Loos's tomb.

Poor health
All his life, Loos suffered from a hearing impairment. When he was a child, he was deaf. He only acquired partial hearing at the age of 12. In 1918 Loos was diagnosed with cancer. His stomach, appendix and part of his intestine were removed. By the time he was 50 he was nearly deaf.

Child sexual abuse
In 1928 Loos was disgraced by a pedophilia scandal in Vienna. He had commissioned young girls, aged 8 to 10, from poor families to act as models in his studio. The indictment stated that Loos had exposed himself and forced his young models to participate in sexual acts. He was found partially guilty in a court decision of 1928. In 2008 the original case record was rediscovered and confirmed the accusation.

Death and legacy

Adolf Loos exhibited early signs of dementia around the time of his court proceedings. A few months before his death he suffered a stroke. He died aged 62 on 23 August 1933 in Kalksburg near Vienna. Loos's body was taken to Vienna's Zentralfriedhof to rest among the great artists and musicians of the city, including Schoenberg, Altenberg and Kraus, some of his closest friends and associates.

Through his writings and his groundbreaking projects in Vienna, Loos was able to influence other architects and designers, and the early development of Modernism. His careful selection of materials, passion for craftsmanship and use of 'Raumplan'—the considered ordering and size of interior spaces based on function—are still admired.

Major works 

 1899 Café Museum, Vienna
 1904 Villa Karma, Montreux, Switzerland
 1907 Field Christian Cross, Radešínská Svratka, Czech Republic
 1908 American Bar (formerly the Kärntner Bar), Vienna
 1910 Steiner House, Vienna
 1910 Goldman & Salatsch Building, overlooking Michaelerplatz, Vienna (a mixed-use building known colloquially as the "Looshaus")
 1913 Scheu House, Vienna
 1915 Sugar mill, Hrušovany u Brna, Czech Republic
 1915–16 Villa Duschnitz (re-model), Vienna
 1917 House for sugar mill owner, Hrušovany u Brna, Czech Republic
 1921 Mausoleum for Max Dvořák (unbuilt)
 1922 Rufer House, Vienna
 1925 Maison Tzara, house and studio, Montmartre, Paris, for Tristan Tzara, one of the founders of Dadaism
 1926 Villa Moller, Vienna
 1927 House (not built), Paris, for the American entertainer Josephine Baker
 1928 Villa Müller, Prague, Czech Republic
 1929 Khuner Villa, Kreuzberg, Austria
 1932 Villa Winternitz, Na Cihlářce 10, Praha 5, Czech Republic
 1928–1933 many residential interiors in Plzeň, Czech Republic

Expositions 

 Adolf Loos - Exposition Du Cinquantenaire (23.02. – 16.04.1983) Paris (Institut Francais d´Architecture with Austrian Culture Institute, Paris) Ancienne Galerie, 6, rue du Tournon, 75006 Paris
 Gründerzeit: Adolf Loos (11.04.1987 – 21.06.1987) Städtische Galerie der Stadt Karlsruhe, Karlsruhe, Germany
 ADOLF LOOS (02.12.1989-25.02.1990) (joint exposition on 3 locations) Albertina, Historical Museum of the City of Vienna, Looshaus, Vienna
 Adolf Loos „Private Spaces“ (14.12.2017 – 25.02.2018) Museu del Dessiny de Barcelona, Spain
 Adolf Loos „Private Spaces“ (28.03.2018-24-06.2018) Caixa Forum Madrid, Spain
 WAGNER, HOFFMANN, LOOS AND THE FURNITURE DESIGN OF VIENNESE MODERNISM (21.03.-07.10.2018) Imperial Furniture Collection (Hofmobiliendepot), Vienna
 Adolf Loos: Private Houses (08.12.2020-14.03.2021) MAK Museum of Applied Arts, Vienna
 „Loos2021“ (25.9.2020 – 30.5.2021) Loos Rooms at the Vienna Library, (former Boskovits flat) Bartensteingasse 9/5, 1010 Wien

Bibliography

References

Further reading 

 

 
Oechslin, Werner, "Stilhülse und Kern: Otto Wagner, Adolf Loos und der evolutionäre Weg zur modernen Architektur", Zuerich 1994.

Adolf Loos: Our Contemporary (New York, Columbia GSAPP, 2013), eds. Y. Safran and Cristobal Amunategui. Published on the occasion of the traveling exhibition "Adolf Loos: Our Contemporary," a cooperation between Columbia University GSAPP in New York, the MAK in Vienna, and the CAAA in Guimaraes. Essays by Beatriz Colomina, Hermann Czech, Rainald Franz, Benedetto Gravagnuolo, Christopher Long, Can Onaner, Daniel Sherer, Philip Ursprung.

External links 

 
 Adolf Loos online exhibition images, podcasts and video about Loos's life and work. Royal Institute of British Architects
 Adolf Loos, Vienna 1900 & Austrian Modern Architecture TourMyCountry.com
 Adolf Loos biography 1870–1933 WOKA Lamps Vienna
 

1870 births
1933 deaths
Architects from Brno
People from the Margraviate of Moravia
Moravian-German people
Austrian people of Moravian-German descent
Art Nouveau architects
Austrian architects
Architecture critics
Architectural theoreticians
Austrian architecture writers
Austrian expatriates in France
Austrian expatriates in the United States
Modernist architects
Austrian people convicted of child sexual abuse
Burials at the Vienna Central Cemetery